Following is a sortable list of films produced in Italy in 1964.

See also

1964 in film
1964 in Italian television

References

Footnotes

Sources

External links
Italian films of 1964 at the Internet Movie Database

Lists of 1964 films by country or language
1964
Films